Shane Lavalette (born 1987) is an American photographer.

Life and work
Lavalette was born in Burlington, Vermont. He studied photography at Tufts University and the School of the Museum of Fine Arts, Boston, where he received a BFA in 2009.

In 2010, Lavalette was commissioned by the High Museum of Art in Atlanta to contribute to their Picturing the South series, His work was exhibited there in 2012 and received media coverage from CNN, Time, NPR, and The New York Times. His book One Sun, One Shadow is an extension of this body of work.

In 2011, Lavalette was hired as the associate director of Light Work, a non-profit photography organization in Syracuse, New York. He was appointed director two years later, in 2013.  At Light Work, Lavalette oversees the organization's Artist-in-Residence Program, exhibitions, and publication of Contact Sheet, a photography journal.

In 2017, Lavalette was commissioned by Fotostiftung Schwiz to follow the footsteps of the Swiss photographer Theo Frey to investigate the same villages Frey documented in 1939 for the Swiss National Exhibition (Schweizerische Landesausstellung); Carona, Gais, Ruderswill, Saignelegier, Saint-Saphorin, Sainte-Croix, Schwyz, Stammheim, Vicosoprano, Visperterminen, Wil and Zuoz that resulted in the book Still (Noon), published by Patrick Frey in 2018.

Publications

Publications by Lavalette
One Sun, One Shadow. Self-published, 2016. With a text by Tim Davis. Edition of 1500 copies. .
Still (Noon). Patrick Frey, 2018. Edition of 1000 copies. .

Publications with contribution by Lavalette
reGeneration2: Tomorrow's Photographers Today. London: Thames & Hudson, 2010. .
Photographs Not Taken: A Collection of Photographers' Essays. Chapel Hill, NC: Daylight, 2012. By Will Steacy. Second revised edition. . With an introduction by Lyle Rexer.
Unfamiliar Familiarities—Outside Views on Switzerland. Zürich: Lars Müller, 2017. Edited by Peter Pfrunder, Lars Willumeit, and Tatyana Franck. . A six-volume set: one volume by Lavalette and the others by Alinka Echeverría, Eva Leitolf, Simon Roberts, and Zhang Xiao, plus a text volume in English, German, and French. Published to accompany an exhibition at Fotostiftung Schweiz, Winterthur, Switzerland and Musée de l'Élysée, Lausanne, Switzerland.
LOST II (LOST, Syracuse). New York: Kris Graves Projects, 2019. Includes a poem by Carrie Mae Weems and a text by Arthur Flowers.

Awards
Yousuf Karsh Prize in Photography, Museum of Fine Arts, Boston, 2009
 Focus Award: Rising Star, Griffin Museum of Photography, 2013
Pollock-Krasner Foundation Grant, 2019.

References

External links
 

1987 births
Living people
American photographers
Artists from Burlington, Vermont
Artists from Syracuse, New York
Tufts University alumni
School of the Museum of Fine Arts at Tufts alumni